Bark River may refer to the following places or geographical features in the United States:

Rivers
 Bark River (Michigan), a river in Michigan
 Bark River (Rock River), a river in Wisconsin, tributary of the Rock River
 Bark River (Lake Superior), a river in Wisconsin, tributary of Lake Superior

Other
 Bark River, Michigan, an unincorporated community
 Bark River Township, Michigan
 Bark River International Raceway, an off-road racing track near the Michigan community, host of the Traxxas TORC Series